Sovan Chatterjee (born 7 July 1964) is an Indian politician. He is a former member of Bharatiya Janata Party, and former Mayor of the city of Kolkata, the capital of the Indian state of West Bengal. Chatterjee served as a Kolkata Municipal Corporation (KMC) councilor since 1985. In 2019, he joined Bharatiya Janata Party, and left in 2021.

Political career
Chatterjee, a councillor in the KMC since 1985, also served as a mayor in council from 2000 to 2005, of the corporation. Chatterjee won the Behala Purba seat in the 2011 West Bengal Assembly election, which he retained in 2016.

Mayor of Kolkata 
In 2010, he was appointed the mayor of Kolkata by his party All India Trinamool Congress, with Farzana Alam being appointed his deputy. He resigned from the mayor post on 22 November 2018.

Cabinet Minister
Chatterjee was made a cabinet minister in 2016. Former mayor Bikash Ranjan Bhattacharya said that there was no provision in law that prevents a mayor from holding ministerial berth. With the decline in supply of cattle, India's first fully automated slaughterhouse (in Tangra area) was shut in May 2017. Chatterjee reacted by saying that he would examine the matter.

In December 2016, Chatterjee became the first mayor of any city of India to get Z-plus security cover (the highest level of security cover in India). In that category, he would get security cover by National Security Guard commandos.

In November 2014, Chatterjee was announced as the mayoral candidate of his party for the civic polls which were to be held in 2015. He was reappointed the mayor of the city in May, as his party won the polls.

Career In BJP
On 22 November 2018 he resigned from the mayor post of Kolkata Municipal Corporation. He later joined BJP on 14 August 2019. He was the observer of Kolkata Zone for West Bengal Bharatiya Janata Party. On 14 March 2021 he quit BJP along with his girlfriend/Live-in partner Baisakhi Banerjee citing unhappiness over not getting assembly election WB '21 ticket in his desired place.

Views

Bhangar Power Grid 
Chatterjee supports the restoration work of building the Bhangar Power Grid, which was stopped due to protests of villagers over acquisition of land. He said that outsiders with vested interests were hindering development.

Water crisis 
In May 2017, there were reports of water crisis in South Kolkata. Areas affected included Garden Reach, Watgunj, Kidderpore. Left Front councillors boycotted a monthly meeting of the Kolkata Municipal Corporation to protest against the body's inability to solve the issue. About the complaints, Chatterjee said that the opposition were making a "mountain out of a mole hill".

Controversies
On 17 May 2021, he along with senior minister in the Mamata Banerjee cabinet, Subrata Mukherjee, MLA and former minister Madan Mitra and Firhad Hakim has been arrested by Central Bureau of Investigation from their house in connection with the Narada sting operation.

References

External links

 Mayor's desk, KMC Official Website

Living people
Politicians from Kolkata
1964 births
Jogesh Chandra Chaudhuri Law College alumni
University of Calcutta alumni
Mayors of Kolkata
West Bengal MLAs 2011–2016
Bharatiya Janata Party politicians from West Bengal
West Bengal MLAs 2016–2021
Former members of Trinamool Congress